Kurt Jensen may refer to:

 Kurt Jensen (musician) (1913–2011), Danish-Australian mandolin player
 Kurt Jensen (computer scientist) (born 1950), Danish computer science professor